is a city located in east central Yamaguchi Prefecture, Japan. As of October 1, 2016, the city has an estimated population of 143,959 and a population density of 220 persons per km2. The total area is 656.13 km2.

The modern city of Shūnan was founded on April 21, 2003, by the merger of the cities of  Tokuyama and Shinnan'yō, the town of Kumage (from Kumage District), and the town of Kano (from Tsuno District). Its name is derived from the first character (周) of the name of the former Suō Province (周防国), and the character for south (南), reflecting its location, comprising much of the southern part of the old province.

The city is bordered in the west by the cities of Yamaguchi and Hōfu, in the east by Iwakuni, in the southeast by Hikari and Kudamatsu, and in the north by Yoshika, Shimane Prefecture. To the south is the Inland Sea.

History
April 21, 2003: Shūnan is founded by the merger of Tokuyama, Shinnan'yō, Kano  (from Tsuno District) and Kumage (from Kumage District). Tsuno District was dissolved as a result of this merger.
May 25, 2003: Kazuto Kawamura becomes first mayor.
April 22, 2007: Yukio Shimazu defeats Ken'ichirō Kimura to become city's second mayor.

Communities

 Mitake

Education

The city previously had a North Korean school, Tokuyama Korean Elementary and Junior High School (徳山朝鮮初中級学校). Shunan also hosts Tokuyama University, a private institution which was founded in 1971.

Sister cities
 Delfzijl, Netherlands (1990, Shinnan'yō)
 Townsville, Australia (1990, Tokuyama)
 São Bernardo do Campo, Brazil (1973, Tokuyama)

Economy and industry
The food processing company, Shimaya, has headquarters in Shunan. Also, the petroleum company, Idemitsu Kosan; the chemical company, Tosoh and Tokuyama; the iron product company, Nisshin Steel; all have plants based in Shunan.

Sports
Before Tokuyama became part of Shūnan, it was one of the host cities of the official 1998 Women's Volleyball World Championship.

References

External links
 Shūnan City official website 

Cities in Yamaguchi Prefecture
Port settlements in Japan
Populated coastal places in Japan